John the Bastard is a 1967 Italian Spaghetti Western film written and directed by Armando Crispino  and starring  John Richardson.

Plot
John is the illegitimate son of a wealthy landowner. He decides to take revenge for the disinterest that his father has always shown towards him. He becomes the lover of his stepbrother's wife and when he challenges him to a duel he kills him. The woman commits suicide and John, satisfied, continues his cynical existence until the relatives of other women seduced by him try to kill him.

Cast

References

External links

1967 films
1967 Western (genre) films
Spaghetti Western films
Films directed by Armando Crispino
Films shot in Almería
1960s Italian-language films
English-language Italian films
1960s English-language films
1960s Italian films